North East Scotland College (abbreviated as NESCol) was formed on 1 November 2013 from the merger of Aberdeen College and Banff & Buchan College. The regional college serves an extensive geographical area with its main centres in Aberdeen and Fraserburgh.

The main NESCol campus – Aberdeen City Campus, is based at the Gallowgate in Aberdeen. The College has two other sites in and around Aberdeen - Aberdeen Altens and Aberdeen Clinterty.  Outside of Aberdeen, it has a campus located in Fraserburgh and two learning centres in Ellon and Inverurie.  It also operates the Scottish Maritime Academy in Peterhead.

The College also provides training in a number of community settings throughout Aberdeen City and Aberdeenshire.

North East Scotland College operates across three major subject areas: Engineering, Science and Technology; Creative Industries, Computing and Business Enterprise; and Service Industries. The College has over 7,000 full-time students and 14,000 part-time students.

References

Further education colleges in Scotland
Higher education colleges in Scotland
Further education colleges in the Collab Group
Educational institutions established in 2013
2013 establishments in Scotland